Moorestown may refer to:

Technology:
 Moorestown computing platform by Intel

United States geography:
 Moorestown, Indiana
 Moorestown, Michigan
 Moorestown, New Jersey
 Moorestown-Lenola, New Jersey

United States education:
 Moorestown Friends School, private Quaker school located at East Main Street and Chester Avenue in Moorestown, New Jersey
 Moorestown High School, four-year comprehensive public high school that serves students in ninth through twelfth grades
 Moorestown Township Public Schools, comprehensive community public school district

United States court cases
 Hornstine v. Moorestown, a 2003 case in U.S. Federal District Court

See also
 Moorstown Castle